Vaughan Gething (born 15 March 1974) is a Welsh Labour and Co-operative politician serving as Minister for the Economy since 2021. He previously served as the Minister for Health and Social Services from 2016 to 2021. He has been the Member of the Senedd (MS) for Cardiff South and Penarth since 2011.

Early life
Gething was born in Zambia in 1974, where his father, a White Welsh vet from Ogmore-by-Sea in Glamorgan, met his mother who is a Black Zambian. Gething describes his father as "a white Welsh economic migrant". When he was two years old, he moved to Monmouthshire, Wales, with his family and has three brothers and a sister. His father eventually found work in Dorset, England, where Gething was brought up.

He studied at Beaminster Comprehensive and Sixth Form in Dorset, followed by Aberystwyth University where he read Law and graduated in 1999, and then going onto the University of Cardiff Law School, University of Wales. Gething became President of Aberystwyth University Guild of Students and the first Black president of the National Union of Students Wales.

Professional career
Having completed his training as a solicitor in Cardiff in 2001, with the trade union solicitors Thompsons, Gething chose to specialise in employment law. He became a partner in Thompsons in 2007.

In 2008, at the age of 34, Gething became the youngest President of Wales TUC, also becoming the first mixed race person in the role.

Political career

Gething joined the Labour Party when he was 17, to campaign in the 1992 UK general election. He contested Mid and West Wales in the inaugural elections to the National Assembly for Wales in 1999 for Labour and was not elected. He was a councillor from 2004 to 2008, representing Butetown electoral ward on Cardiff Council, having been elected with a majority of two votes. Gething was selected as the Welsh Labour candidate for the Cardiff South and Penarth constituency in the Senedd. Lorraine Barrett, who had represented Cardiff South and Penarth since the Senedd's creation in 1999, had announced her intention to stand down at the 2011 election. At the Senedd election on 5 May 2011, Gething increased the Labour vote with a swing of 12.5%. At 13,814, his share of the vote was over 50%, giving him a majority of 6,259 over the Welsh Conservative Party candidate, Ben Gray, placed second. At the following 2016 Welsh Assembly election, Gething once again increased his majority in terms of vote share.

Following the 2016 election, First Minister Carwyn Jones promoted Gething to the Welsh Cabinet as Cabinet Secretary for Health, Well-being and Sport.

Gething did not support Jeremy Corbyn in either the 2015 or 2016 Labour Party leadership election (against challenger Owen Smith) but stated in a 2017 BBC Radio Wales interview that he would still like to see Corbyn as Prime Minister. "I want a Labour prime minister - and that means Jeremy Corbyn being prime minister." ... "I don't think it matters whether I'm a fan or not - it matters whether I think he can do the job in running the country" Gething said.

Gething, alongside Baroness Eluned Morgan and Mark Drakeford, was one of the three contenders in the 2018 election for the leadership of Welsh Labour, but was defeated by Finance Secretary Mark Drakeford.

Drakeford subsequently reappointed Gething as Health Minister, with the position renamed as Minister for Health and Social Services. On 13 May 2021, Gething was promoted to Minister for the Economy, replacing Ken Skates.

Zoom incident 
On 22 April 2020, Gething was caught swearing about fellow Labour MS Jenny Rathbone in a virtual session of the Senedd. Gething failed to mute his microphone as he told an unknown person "What the fuck is the matter with her?" during the Zoom meeting. Rathbone had been asking the Minister questions about the Welsh Government's response to the COVID-19 pandemic.

Following the incident, both the Welsh Conservative leader, Paul Davies and Plaid Cymru leader, Adam Price called on Mark Drakeford to dismiss Gething as Minister for Health. BBC Wales reported that Labour MSs were also "very angry" over Gething's actions.

Personal life 
Gething and his wife Michelle live in Penarth, where he has lived since 2011. He is a member of the trade unions GMB, UNISON and Unite.

External links

 Official website 
 Biography – Senedd website

References

 

1974 births
Living people
Politicians from Dorset
Politicians from Cardiff
Labour Co-operative members of the Senedd
Wales AMs 2011–2016
Wales MSs 2016–2021
Wales MSs 2021–2026
Alumni of the University of Wales
Councillors in Cardiff
Black British politicians
21st-century Welsh lawyers
Zambian emigrants to the United Kingdom
Zambian people of Welsh descent
Welsh people of Zambian descent